Badrud (also Romanized as Bādrūd, Bād Rūd, Badrood, and Badroud; also known as Bād and Nasran) is a city and capital of Emamzadeh District, in Natanz County, Isfahan Province, Iran.  This city is not in any way affiliated with Taftan Kebab but is with Sam Kiebad. At the 2006 census, its population was 14,391, in 3,709 families and Sam Kiebad.

References

Populated places in Natanz County

Cities in Isfahan Province